Norman Harry Storer (born 5 June 1933) is a British former motorcycle speedway rider.

Born in Ridgeway, Derbyshire, Storer was experienced in other disciplines of motorcycle racing before speedway, starting with trials in 1950 and later road racing and scrambles. He rode in the 1959 Thruxton 500 mile endurance road race, partnering Chris Vincent on a BSA Road Rocket, finishing in seventh place. 

A crash during 1959 resulted in two broken wrists, leaving him with a problem with his right hand, after which he took up grasstrack as a result. He began his speedway career in 1963 with Long Eaton Archers, becoming one of the team's top riders by the following year, and staying with them when they joined the British League in 1965.

He represented England in 1964 against Scotland, and Great Britain in 1965 against an Overseas team, both in Provincial League representative teams. He transferred with the Long Eaton promotion to Leicester Lions in 1968, and stayed with Leicester until his retirement in 1975. His long service was recognised with a testimonial meeting in 1974.

References

1933 births
Living people
British speedway riders
English motorcycle racers
Long Eaton Archers riders
Leicester Lions riders
People from North East Derbyshire District
Sportspeople from Derbyshire